Newtown, (Irish: An Baile Nua) is a townland in the Barony of Kilnamanagh Lower in County Tipperary, Ireland. It is in the civil parish of Aghacrew	
and is one of nineteen townlands known as Newtown in County Tipperary.

References

Townlands of County Tipperary